Mongolia competed at the 2011 Summer Universiade in Shenzhen, China.

Medalists

Cycling

Road
Men
Naran Khangarid
Altanzul Altasnukh
Tuulkhangai Tuguldur
Jamsran Ulziibaatar
Altanzul Maani

Women
Batbaatar Orkhontuya
Tserenlkham Solongo

References

Nations at the 2011 Summer Universiade
2011 in Mongolian sport
Mongolia at the Summer Universiade